Qaqa Wasi or Qaqawasi (Quechua qaqa rock, wasi house, "rock house", Hispanicized spelling Jajahuasi) is a mountain in the Andes of Peru, about  high. It is located in the Puno Region, Sandia Province, Patambuco District. It lies northeast of the mountain Rit'ikunka. South of Qaqa Wasi there is a group of small lakes, among them Rit'iqucha ("snow lake", Riticocha) and Yanaqucha ("black lake", Yanacocha). The lake Quchak'uchu is situated in the Rit'ipata valley southeast of the mountain.

References 

Mountains of Puno Region
Mountains of Peru